Ken Ober (July 3, 1957 – November 15, 2009) was an American game show host, comedian, and actor.

Early life and career 

Born Kenneth Oberding in Brookline, Massachusetts, he was raised in a suburb of Hartford, Connecticut, where his first job was as a bagger at a local Jewish supermarket. Ober hosted four game shows over the course of his career. He received his break after appearing as a contestant on Star Search in 1984. He was most widely known for his role on the MTV game show Remote Control, which he hosted for three seasons.  That show also helped launch the careers of Adam Sandler, Denis Leary, Kari Wuhrer, and Colin Quinn. Ober was known among 1990s and 2000s audiences for his hosting jobs on Make Me Laugh, Smush, and the ESPN game show Perfect Match.

Ober was the frequent color analyst alongside veteran play by play announcer Steve Albert for the "MTV Rock N' Jock" celebrity sports specials during the 1990s.

In 1995, Ober hosted a Los Angeles talk radio show with former Brady Bunch star Susan Olsen.  The show, known as Ober and Olsen, aired on 97.1 KLSX.  (Olsen had previously appeared on an episode of Remote Control that featured Brady Bunch cast members competing.)

In 2002, Ober served as supervising producer for Colin Quinn's Tough Crowd with Colin Quinn. Ober was also a guest on one episode.

Ober starred in the Blues Traveler video for the song "Hook".  He also had a smaller role in the same band's videos for "Run-Around" and "The Mountains Win Again".

He served as a producer for the CBS comedy The New Adventures of Old Christine, and is also known for a series of Jenga commercials.

He was a founding member of the Theta Mu chapter of the Pi Kappa Alpha International Fraternity at the University of Massachusetts Amherst. He graduated in 1980.

Death 
Ober died at his home in Santa Monica on November 15, 2009, at the age of 52. According to friends, Ober had been feeling ill and was complaining of headaches, chronic chest pain, and flu-like symptoms the previous afternoon.

After an autopsy, it was confirmed by the Los Angeles County Department of Medical Examiner-Coroner that Ober died of natural causes, chiefly ischemic heart disease, and atherosclerotic coronary artery disease.

References

External links 
 
 Obituary in The New York Times
 Remembrance by friend and fellow comedian Allan Havey on AllanHavey.com
 RIP Ken Ober, dead at 52

1957 births
2009 deaths
American male film actors
American game show hosts
American male television actors
Television producers from Massachusetts
American television writers
American male television writers
University of Massachusetts Amherst alumni
People from Brookline, Massachusetts
Comedians from Massachusetts
20th-century American comedians
21st-century American comedians
Screenwriters from Massachusetts
20th-century American male actors
20th-century American screenwriters
20th-century American male writers